The following lists events from 1996 in China.

Incumbents
 Party General Secretary: Jiang Zemin
 President: Jiang Zemin
 Premier: Li Peng 
 Vice President: Rong Yiren 
 Vice Premier: Zhu Rongji

Governors  
 Governor of Anhui Province – Hui Liangyu 
 Governor of Fujian Province – Chen Mingyi then He Guoqiang 
 Governor of Gansu Province – Zhang Wule then Sun Ying 
 Governor of Guangdong Province – Zhu Senlin then Lu Ruihua 
 Governor of Guizhou Province – Chen Shineng then Wu Yixia
 Governor of Hainan Province – Ruan Chongwu 
 Governor of Hebei Province – Ye Liansong 
 Governor of Heilongjiang Province – Tian Fengshan 
 Governor of Henan Province – Ma Zhongchen 
 Governor of Hubei Province – Jiang Zhuping 
 Governor of Hunan Province – Yang Zhengwu
 Governor of Jiangsu Province – Zheng Silin 
 Governor of Jiangxi Province – Shu Shengyou 
 Governor of Jilin Province – Wang Yunkun
 Governor of Liaoning Province – Wen Shizhen 
 Governor of Qinghai Province – Tian Chengping 
 Governor of Shaanxi Province – Cheng Andong 
 Governor of Shandong Province – Li Chunting
 Governor of Shanxi Province – Sun Wensheng 
 Governor of Sichuan Province – Xiao Yang then Song Baorui 
 Governor of Yunnan Province – Li Jiating 
 Governor of Zhejiang Province – Wan Xueyuan

Events

January
January 27 – Miss Chinese International Pageant 1996 was held.

February
February 14 –
Intelsat 708 was destroyed (day in China at the time).
Long March 3B launched its first flight.
February 3 – 1996 Lijiang earthquake hit Lijiang City and left at least 322 killed, 3,925 serious injuries, and 13,000 injuries.

March
March 23 –
 The Republic of China presidential election took place. Lee Teng-hui was elected president and Lien Chan as vice president.
The Third Taiwan Strait Crisis ended.

April
 April 14 to October 27 – Chinese Jia-A League 1996 was held with Dalian Wanda winning the championship.

June
June 24 – Hengda Enterprise Company founded by Xu Jiayi, as predecessor of conglomerate, mainly real estate business, Evergrande was founded in Shenzhen, Guangdong Province.

July
July 19 to August 4 – China competed in the 1996 Summer Olympics with total of 294 athletes.

September
September 27 to 29 – The first round of the 1996 FIVB World Grand Prix took place in Shanghai.

Births
January 2 – Xiaoyu Yu, figure skater
January 7 – Fu Yuanhui, swimmer
June 10 – Wen Junhui, singer, actor, member of Seventeen
August 27 – Wang Jianan, long jumper

See also
List of Chinese films of 1996
List of Hong Kong films of 1996
Category:1996 Establishments in China
China at the 1996 Summer Olympics
China at the 1996 Summer Paralympics
China at the 1996 Asian Winter Games

References

External sources
China in 1996 :: The Economy -- Encyclopædia Britannica

 
Years of the 20th century in China
China
1990s in China